The Philippines National Rugby League Championship (or the PNRL for short) is the top level domestic rugby league competition in the Philippines.

History 
The Philippines National Rugby League was first formed in 2012. In 2013 the Philippines commenced their first rugby league (touch) competition with 6 teams participating along with a further 3, participating in Rugby League 9s. A full scale 13 a side rugby league competition is scheduled to commence in the third quarter of 2016. With 4 teams are set to compete in the inaugural season.

By October 13, 2016, it was reported that the league is now known as the Philippine Tamaraw Rugby League. The inaugural tournament for the league is the Erick Paul Estepa Elefante Cup which is to be held at the Bicol University, Albay Sports Complex in October 15–16, 2016.

Teams

See also
Philippines national rugby league team

References

Philippines National Rugby League